The 1979 Benson & Hedges Cup was the eighth competition of cricket's Benson & Hedges Cup. The competition was won by Essex County Cricket Club.

Controversy

Going into the final round of matches in Group A, Somerset held a three-point lead over both Glamorgan and Worcestershire. Worcestershire were due to play Somerset at New Road while Glamorgan had an easy fixture against Minor Counties South at Watford.

It was mathematically possible for both Glamorgan and Worcestershire to overhaul Somerset in the table, and qualify for the quarter-finals, if both teams won (leaving all three on nine points) and their bowling strike rates improved and Somerset's worsened. Bowling strike rate was used as a tie-breaker in the event of teams finishing level on points.

In the match at Worcester, Somerset's captain Brian Rose won the toss and elected to bat. After one over, which yielded a no-ball, Rose declared, leaving Worcestershire a target of two which they knocked off in 10 balls. This left Somerset's strike rate intact. The action was in fact unnecessary as Glamorgan's match was washed out.

Although Rose was condemned, there was nothing in the Rules against a declaration in limited overs cricket at the time. The action was, however, viewed as being against the spirit of the game. By a vote of 17–1 at a meeting on 1 June, the TCCB ejected Somerset from the Benson & Hedges Cup, their place in the quarter-finals being taken by Glamorgan.

Fixtures and results

Group stage

Group A

	
1 Somerset were ejected from the competition for bringing the game into disrepute after they declared at 1/0 after one over in their match against Worcestershire in order to ensure that they could not be overtaken on strike-rate.

Group B

Group C

Group D

Quarter-finals

Semi-finals

Final

References

See also
Benson & Hedges Cup		

Benson & Hedges Cup seasons
1979 in English cricket